Lucas Cominelli (born 15 December 1976) is an Argentine former professional footballer who played as a midfielder. He works as a football agent.

Career
Cominelli trialled with Newcastle United and played with the club's reserves but did not earn a contract. He trialled with Carlisle United. He joined Las Palmas following a trial. In March 2003, while on an amateur contract with Atlético Madrid, he trialled with Norwegian club SK Brann but failed to impress.

Cominelli joined Malaysia Super League club Pahang FA ahead of the 2004 season. In August 2004 he trialled with Regionalliga side Fortuna Düsseldorf.

Following a trial in January 2005, Cominelli joined Football League Two side Oxford United. He expressed interest in remaining at the club but was not kept.

Cominelli played for Segunda División B club Ceuta in the 2005–06 season. In January 2006 the club tried to agree the termination of his contract.

In summer 2007 he moved to Segunda División B side Vecindario. He left after half of the season.

References

External links 
 
 
 
 Rage Online Profile
 En Una Baldosa Profile 
 Carriere calciatori Profile

Living people
1976 births
Argentine people of Italian descent
Argentine footballers
Association football midfielders
Serie C players
Serie D players
Malaysia Super League players
English Football League players
Granada CF footballers
U.S. Avellino 1912 players
UD Las Palmas players
Vastese Calcio 1902 players
Sri Pahang FC players
Oxford United F.C. players
AD Ceuta footballers
Ayia Napa FC players
Ethnikos Achna FC players
UD Vecindario players
Argentine expatriate footballers
Argentine expatriate sportspeople in Italy
Expatriate footballers in Italy
Argentine expatriate sportspeople in Spain
Expatriate footballers in Spain
Argentine expatriate sportspeople in Malaysia
Expatriate footballers in Malaysia
Argentine expatriate sportspeople in England
Expatriate footballers in England
Argentine expatriate sportspeople in Cyprus
Expatriate footballers in Cyprus
Footballers from Buenos Aires